Pan Shiji or Chew Shyh-Ji (born 29 July 1957) is a Taiwanese composer, writer and music educator.

Biography
Pan Shiji was born in Taipei, and her family emigrated to Canada in 1974. In Canada, she studied composition with Robert Turner at the University of Manitoba from 1976 to 80 and then in America studying with Chou Wen-chung at Columbia University, New York, from 1980 to 1988. During this time, she worked at the Columbia Center for Ethnomusicology. In 1988, she returned to Taiwan and took a position as professor of composition at the National Academy of the Arts. Her manuscripts are housed in the Liu Collection, Institute of Chinese Studies, University of Heidelberg.

Works
Selected works include:

Orchestra: 
Dream World, 1979
Music for Orchestra, 1980
3 Pieces, 1982
Raining Night, 1997–9
Vocal: 
The Lodge Amid the Bamboos, 1980
Paiju sanshou [3 Haiku], 1991
3 Songs (Pan), 1996
In the Dark (Pan), 1998
Qiu Lu, 1998
Chamber and solo instrument: 
Music for Hn and Pianoforte, 1979
Music for Pianoforte, 1979
Wind Quintet, 1979
Brass Quintet, 1980
String Quartet in 1 Movement, 1980
Ensemble, 1981
Hudson River Caprice, 1981
String Quartet, 1981
Piece, 1984
String Quartet no.1, 1985
String Quartet no.2, 1986
String Quartet no.3, 1988
Dubai de nigu [The Soliloquy of Pandora], 1990
Configuration – Transformation – Shape
Shapes, 1996
Si, 1997
String Quartet no.4, 1998

Writings
"Wei'erdi de geju yu guojia yishi" [Nationalism in Verdi's operas], Lishi yuekan, xiii/2 (1989)
"Genji monogatari de yinyue shenghuo: shitan yazhou yinyue wenhua jiaoliu" [Musical life in the Tale of Genji: a study in Asian musical exchange], Yishu pinglun (1990), no.10
"Anuo Xunbaike xunzhao shi'eryin zuopin hesheng ji qushi de tongyixing" [Schoenberg in search of harmonic and formal unity], Yishu pinglun (1993), no.10; (1995), no.10
"Ershi shiji yinyue xin shengsi" [New ideas on 20th-century music] Biaoyan yishu zazhi (1994), no.9

References

1957 births
20th-century classical composers
21st-century classical composers
Women classical composers
Living people
Taiwanese music educators
Musicians from Taipei
Taiwanese classical composers
Women music educators
20th-century women composers
21st-century women composers